The Icaro Twin Electric is an Italian electric ultralight trike that was designed by World Hang Glider Champion pilot Manfred Ruhmer and under development by Icaro 2000 of Sangiano.

As of 2018 the aircraft was not advertised on the manufacturer's website and it is likely that it did not progress beyond one flying prototype.

Design and development
The Twin Electric design features a cable-braced hang glider-style high-wing, weight-shift controls, a two-seats-in-tandem open cockpit without a cockpit fairing, tricycle landing gear and twin electric motors mounted on lateral booms, in pusher configuration.

The aircraft is made from bolted-together aluminum tubing, with its single surface Rx Bip bi-place wing covered in Dacron sailcloth. Its wing is supported by a single tube-type kingpost and uses an "A" frame weight-shift control bar. Power is supplied by two electric motors mounted on booms, one each side of the trike frame, each driving a pusher propeller.

The Rx Bip wing was selected to allow STOL capabilities.

Operational history
The Twin Electric was reported as being flight tested in 2015.

Specifications (Twin Electric)

References

Twin Electric
2010s Italian sport aircraft
2010s Italian ultralight aircraft
Twin-motored electric aircraft
Ultralight trikes